William Preston Snyder (October 7, 1851 – June 18, 1920) was an American physician and politician who served as President Pro Tempore of the Pennsylvania Senate from 1899–1902 and Pennsylvania Auditor General from 1904–1907. He was a member of the Republican Party from Chester County. In 1908, Snyder was convicted in a graft scandal involving the furnishing of the Pennsylvania State Capitol and received a two-year prison sentence for conspiracy to defraud the state.

Early life and education 
Snyder was born in East Vincent Township, Pennsylvania, to farmer-parents George and Maria Shenkel Snyder. He attended Millersville State Normal School and Ursinus College, taught school in 1868 and 1869, and received his MD from the University of Pennsylvania in 1873. He practiced medicine from 1873 to 1886 and worked as Spring City postmaster from 1883 to 1885. He became a medical examiner for the Pennsylvania Railroad Company and prothonotary of Chester County in 1886.

Political career 
In fall of 1890, Snyder was elected to the Pennsylvania House of Representatives and served from 1891 to 1892, when he successfully ran to represent the 19th district in the Pennsylvania State Senate, which he did from 1893 to 1904. He served as Senate president pro tempore from 1899 to 1902. He chaired the Senate Appropriations and Health and Sanitation committees and served on committees for Congressional Apportionment, Corporations, Education, Finance, Insurance, Judiciary Special, New Counties and New Seats, Mines and Mining, Public Roads and Highways, Railroads and Street Passenger Railways.

Snyder was elected Pennsylvania Auditor General in November 1903, winning by a margin of 237,602 votes. He held the office from 1904 through 1907. Scandal derailed his career when he, along with four other officials, faced charges of conspiracy to defraud the state in connection with the construction and furnishing of the state capitol. Although he maintained his innocence until his death, Snyder was convicted in December 1908, sentenced to two years in prison at the Eastern State Penitentiary, and ordered to pay a $500 fine. The state supreme court upheld the conviction and sentence on appeal in March 1910.

Snyder served as an elected delegate to the Pennsylvania Republican Conventions of 1878 and 1882 and chaired the Chester County Republican Committee in 1890, resigning when nominated for Senate. He was a Freemason and Knight Templar.

Personal life 
Snyder married schoolteacher Elisabeth Friday (or Elizabeth Fridy) in 1868 or 1869. The couple had one son, Thomas.

He died on June 18, 1920, more than a year after suffering a paralytic stroke, in Kimberton, Pennsylvania, at the age of 68 (not at age 69 as reported at the time). He was interred at the East Village Reformed Cemetery in Spring City, Pennsylvania.

References 

1851 births
1920 deaths
People from Chester County, Pennsylvania
19th-century American physicians
19th-century American politicians
20th-century American politicians
Ursinus College alumni
Millersville University of Pennsylvania alumni
Perelman School of Medicine at the University of Pennsylvania alumni
Pennsylvania Auditors General
Republican Party members of the Pennsylvania House of Representatives
Republican Party Pennsylvania state senators
American Freemasons
Pennsylvania politicians convicted of corruption
Pennsylvania politicians convicted of crimes